Drepanogynis protactosema is a species of moth of the  family Geometridae. It is found in North & East Madagascar.

The wingspan of this species is 32–34 mm. The forewings are rather elongated,  pallid purple or more violaceous, with quite sparse blackish irroration. The costal edge is narrowly reddish.

References

Ennominae
Moths described in 1932
Moths of Madagascar
Moths of Africa